KAOI-FM (95.1 FM, "95.1 KAOI") is an American radio station licensed to serve the community of Wailuku, Hawaii, United States. The station, established in 1974, broadcasts a rock adult contemporary music format with a hybrid of classic rock and adult alternative. The station is currently owned by Visionary Related Entertainment, LLC.

Gallery

References

External links

AOI-FM
Mainstream adult contemporary radio stations in the United States
Radio stations established in 1974
1974 establishments in Hawaii